Mercy Kyomugasho Kainobwisho (born c.1979), is a Ugandan lawyer, business administrator and corporate executive, who serves as the registrar general and executive director of the Uganda Registration Services Bureau (URSB), effective December 2020. Prior to her current position, she served as the director of intellectual property at URSB.

Background and education
Kainobwisho was born in Uganda circa 1979. She holds a Bachelor of Laws degree, obtained from the Makerere University, Uganda's largest and oldest public university. She went on to obtain a Diploma in Legal Practice from the Law Development Centre, in Kampala, Uganda's capital city. Her degree of Master of Laws was awarded by the University of Turin in Italy. She also holds a Master of Business Administration, obtained from Makerere University Business School.

Career
In 2004, after admission to the Bar in Uganda, Kainobwisho joined 
Shonubi Musoke & Company Advocates, as a Legal Assistant, serving there for one year. She then transferred to the Uganda Ministry of Justice and Constitutional Affairs, as a State Attorney, working there for six years until October 2011.

In November 2011, she joined URSB as the Manager, Intellectual Property, serving in that capacity until June 2013. She was then promoted to Director, Business Registration, serving there until February 2017, when she became the Director, Intellectual Property at URSB.

In December 2020, following the election of Bemanya Twebaze as Director General of the African Regional Intellectual Property Organization (ARIPO), the Board of Directors of URSB conducted interviews for his replacement and Mercy Kainobwisho was selected as the best candidate. She assumed office on 22 December 2020.

References

External links
Mercy Kainobwisho replaces Bemanya Twebaze as Registrar General at URSB As of 8 December 2020.

Living people
1979 births
21st-century Ugandan lawyers
Ugandan women lawyers
21st-century Ugandan businesswomen
21st-century Ugandan businesspeople
Chief executive officers
University of Turin alumni
Makerere University alumni
Law Development Centre alumni
Makerere University Business School alumni
People from Western Region, Uganda